The Neapolitan flip coffee pot ( or caffettiera napoletana, ;) is a drip brew coffeemaker for the stove top that was very popular in Italy until last century. Unlike a moka express, a napoletana does not use the pressure of steam to force the water through the coffee, relying instead on gravity.

History
The napoletana was invented in 1819 by a Frenchman named Morize. It was originally constructed out of copper, until 1886, when the material was switched to aluminum. The reason for taking its name from the city of Naples is due to the fact that Morize was in love with a Neapolitan girl. The namesake cuccumella derives from cuccuma, meaning "copper or terracotta vase".

Structure and use
It consists of a bottom section filled with water, a filter section in the middle filled with finely ground coffee, and an upside-down pot placed on the top. When the water boils, the entire three-part coffee maker is flipped over to let the water filter through the coffee grounds. Once the water has dripped through the grounds, the water-boiling and filter sections are removed, and the coffee is served from the remaining pot. If coarse grounds are used, the coffee is brewed quite mildly. Using very finely ground coffee in the "Neapolitan" style, roasted colour "cloak of monk", this method can produce a coffee that has a stronger flavor than an automatic drip brew maker.

Cuppetiello
The cuppetiello is a small paper cone (which is used in other ways in Naples, such as holding food) that goes over the spout. This is used to preserve the aroma of the coffee while it drips into the tank, which can take up to 10 minutes or more. To make a cuppetiello, a small piece of paper is folded to create a cone shape.
Eduardo de Filippo offers a description of the cuppetiello and the importance of coffee in Naples.

Classic designs
Italian Riccardo Dalisi redesigned this classic for Alessi. He began his research in 1979 and earned international attention when his design entered into production in 1987.
As they have come back to gain some popularity, Ilsa now also makes them in stainless steel.

See also
 Moka pot

References

External links

The Coffee FAQ brewing techniques: Neapolitan

Coffee preparation
Coffee in Italy
French inventions
Products introduced in 1819